Pauline Metzler-Löwy (31 August 1853 - 28 June 1921) was an Austrian contralto singer. Trained at the Prague Conservatory, she performed in Altenburg, Bremen, Brunswick, Hamburg, Leipzig, and other cities.

Early years and education
Pauline Lowy was born at Theresienstadt, Bohemia, 31 August 1853. At the age of seven, she entered the Prague Conservatory, where she studied for four years.

Career
Graduating with honors, she immediately received an engagement at the theater in Altenburg. Her principal roles at this time were in Gluck's Orfeo ed Euridice, Azucena in Il trovatore, and Nancy in Martha. In 1875, she went to Leipzig at the invitation of Friedrich Hasse, then manager of the Stadttheater there, and after her debut, was at once permanently engaged. Here she remained for 12 years, singing with extraordinary success under three successive managers, Hasse, Angelo Neumann, and Max Staegemann. She frequently appeared also at concerts and in oratorio at Hamburg, Bremen, Leipzig, Brunswick, and other cities, her appearance at the musical festival of the Allgemeiner Deutscher Musikverein in 1886 being especially memorable in this connection. In 1881, Lowy married the piano-teacher Ferdinand Metzler. After her retirement from the operatic stage on 12 June 1887, she devoted herself principally to concert performances and later, from 1897, exclusively to vocal instruction. Metzler-Löwy died 28 June 1921 in Roda, Saxony-Anhalt.

References

Bibliography

 
 Vogel, Bernhard, in Muxikalisclics Wochenblatt, pp. 468–470, Leipsic, 1888; Riemanu, Musil-.-Lexikon. 8, J. So.

Attribution

1853 births
1921 deaths
19th-century Austrian women opera singers
Operatic contraltos
Prague Conservatory alumni
People from Terezín
Austrian Jews
20th-century Austrian women opera singers